Airdrie Leaend railway station served the town of Airdrie, North Lanarkshire, Scotland from 1828 to 1843 on the Hallcraig Street branch.

History 
The station opened on 8 August 1828 by the Monkland Railways. It was situated on a siding. Garden Square was built in 1830, which was a local village for railway workers. The station closed in 1843. Nothing remains.

References 

Disused railway stations in North Lanarkshire
Railway stations in Great Britain opened in 1828
Railway stations in Great Britain closed in 1843
1828 establishments in Scotland
1843 disestablishments in Scotland